Gazaria Upazila is one of the six upazilas of Munshiganj District in the Division of Dhaka, Bangladesh. It is located on the Meghna river delta,  from the capital city of Dhaka.

History

Gazaria is mainly composed of alluvial land around the Meghna river. The locality became a part of Tippara Thana under the Assam District during British rule. Gazaria became the part of Munshiganj Thana in 1946 and the independent Gazaria Thana was established in 1954.

The Pakistan government established the Dhaka-Chittagong High way through the locality. Gazaria Thana was turned into an upazila in 1983.

War of Independence

In May 1971, the Pakistani army entered Gazaria by river. A raid on the village of Goshairchar on 9 May killed more than four hundred people. The army proceeded to Bhaberchar where they also killed eleven sheltering in a ditch. Other villages in the area were attacked in the same raid.

Bangladeshi soldiers from Gazaria fought at Bhabercha, Baluakand and Baushia under the leadership of Rafiqul Islam and interrupted communication along the highway by destroying the bridge at Bhaterchar in August 1971, obstructing the advancement of the Pakistani army.

In 2011 the Local Government constructed a memorial at Goshairchar, Gazaria.

Geography
It is the Meghna River delta, which separates it from the district headquarters of Munshiganj. Two bridges connect it with the mainland: the Meghna Bridge in the west, and the Meghna-Gomotee Bridge in the east. The Kajali river flows through the district.

Demographics

According to the 1991 Bangladesh census, Gazaria had a population of 128,368.

Administration
Gazaria Upazila is divided into eight union parishads: Baluakandi, Baushia, Gajaria, Guagachia, Hosendee, Imampur, Tengarchar, and Vaberchar. The union parishads are subdivided into 114 mauzas and 133 villages.

Literacy rate

Gazaria has a literacy rate of 32.7% (counting people over the age of 7), compared to national figures of 32.4%.

References

Upazilas of Munshiganj District